The Five Dragon Pool is a 
culturally significant pond fed by artesian 
karst springs in the city of Jinan, Shandong 
Province, China. It is one of the best known springs among the 72 famous springs of Jinan. 
 
The spring that supplies the water for the Five Dragon Pool belongs to 
a group of springs that also contains 28 other springs, such as the 
Tianjing Spring, Seventy-three Spring, Ximizhi Spring, Dongmizhi 
Spring, Yueya Spring, Jing Spring, and the Congming Spring. The 
water of the Five Dragon Spring originates from the deepest 
circulation of all the springs in Jinan City. 
 
Legend links the Five Dragon Pool to the Tang Dynasty general 
Qin Shubao, whose residence is said to have stood at the 
site. According to the legend, the spring pool formed after torrential 
rains that submersed Qin Shubao's home.

In 1985, the Five Dragon Pool Public Park was established and the garden landscape surrounding the springs was restored

Springs in the group
 Gu Wen Spring
 Xianqing Spring
 Tianjing Spring
 Yueya Spring
 Ximizhi Spring
 Guanjiachi Spring
 Huima Spring
 Qiuxi Spring
 Jade Spring
 Lian Spring

Location

The Five Dragon Pool is located to the west of the historical city 
center of Jinan and to the north of the Baotu Spring. The street 
address of the park is No. 18 Kuangshi Street, Shizhong District, 
Jinan City, People's Republic of China.

See also
Baotu Spring (nearby)
Black Tiger Spring
Pearl Spring
List of sites in Jinan

References
  

Bodies of water of Shandong
Springs of China